Rachel Anne Notley  (born April 17, 1964) is a Canadian politician who served as the 17th premier of Alberta from 2015 to 2019, and has been the leader of the Opposition since 2019. She sits as the member of the Legislative Assembly (MLA) for Edmonton-Strathcona, and is the leader of the Alberta New Democratic Party (NDP). The daughter of former Alberta NDP leader Grant Notley, she was a lawyer before entering politics; she focused on labour law, with a specialty in workers' compensation advocacy and workplace health and safety issues.

Notley was first elected to the Legislative Assembly in the 2008 provincial election, succeeding former NDP leader Raj Pannu. Six years later on October 18, 2014, Notley won the Alberta New Democratic Party leadership election on the first ballot with 70% of the vote and went on to lead the party to a majority victory in the 2015 provincial election, ending 44 years of rule by the Progressive Conservative Association of Alberta. In the 2019 provincial election, the NDP government was defeated by the United Conservative Party, making Notley the Opposition leader.

Background 

Notley was born on April 17, 1964, in Edmonton, Alberta, and was raised outside of the town of Fairview, Alberta, the daughter of Sandra Mary "Sandy" (Wilkinson) and Alberta NDP Leader and MLA Grant Notley. She is the first Alberta premier to be born in Edmonton. Notley is the sister of Paul Notley and Stephen Notley, author and illustrator of Bob the Angry Flower. Her mother, a devout Anglican, was born in Concord, Massachusetts, and moved to Alberta as an adult.

Notley was unafraid to challenge older political leaders as a college student, even asking her father at an Alberta NDP public meeting on poverty and student debt for his advice to a "poor student whose parents made too much money for her to get a loan while at the same time being too cheap to give her enough money to buy food."

Notley credits her mother Sandy with getting her involved in activism, taking Notley to an anti-war demonstration before she was even ten years old. She remained unsure about whether or not to enter public office until she was in her 30s. Alongside her own family background, Notley has also cited her high school social studies teacher Jim Clevette as having made a lasting impact when it comes to her interest in politics. She has also claimed Jack Layton as being a personal hero.

Notley was a twenty-year-old undergraduate at the University of Alberta when her father died on October 19, 1984. After attending a large party she received a call at four in the morning from Tom Sigurdson, her father's executive assistant, stating that there had been a plane crash and that she should return home. This was not the first accident her father had been in; as part of his frequent trips across the province he had already been in several other plane accidents as well as an automobile collision with an elk. Fellow NDP MLA and future Alberta NDP leader Ray Martin later called to confirm to Notley that her father was indeed dead. It was then left up to Notley to inform her mother of the news. A day after her election as Alberta NDP leader, she would lead the 30th anniversary memorial of her father's death.

Notley earned a Bachelor of Arts (BA) in Political Science at the University of Alberta, and a law degree at Osgoode Hall Law School. While at Osgoode Hall she became active in the 1989 federal NDP leadership convention where she endorsed second-place finisher and former BC premier Dave Barrett.

She is married to Lou Arab, a communications representative for the Canadian Union of Public Employees (CUPE) and a campaign strategist for the party. She lives with him and their two children in the historic district of Old Strathcona located in south-central Edmonton.

Notley is a cyclist, jogger, and skier, as well as a reformed smoker.

Activism
After law school, Notley articled for Edmonton labour lawyer Bob Blakely, and went on to work for the Alberta Union of Provincial Employees representing members with Workers' Compensation cases.

In 1994, Notley moved to Vancouver, British Columbia, where she worked for the Health Sciences Association of BC as their occupational health and safety officer. During her time in BC, she worked for one year as a ministerial assistant to Attorney General Ujjal Dosanjh. In this role, she was part of the team that first expanded the application of BC's family relations laws to same sex couples, several years before the Government of Canada took similar initiatives.

Notley acted as a representative of the provincial labour movement in the negotiation and drafting of new workplace health and safety standards.

During her time in Vancouver, Notley was active with "Moms on the Move", an organization that advocated for the rights of special needs children. She is also a past board member of the Vancouver Community College. Notley returned to Edmonton in 2002. She worked for a short time for the National Union of Public and General Employees (NUPGE), worked at Athabasca University, acted as volunteer co-ordinator for the Friends of Medicare "Romanow Now" campaign, and finally as a labour relations officer for the United Nurses of Alberta.

Notley did volunteer work with the Strathcona Community League in 2006, assisting with a drive to garner support for the installation of sidewalks in east Strathcona.

Early political career

Entry into provincial politics 

Notley headed the election-planning subcommittee for the Alberta NDP in 1991, two years before the 1993 provincial election which shut the party out of the legislature. She became involved again with Alberta provincial politics in 2000 following the resignation of Pam Barrett as both Alberta NDP leader and the MLA for Edmonton-Highlands. Notley traveled to Edmonton to help Brian Mason successfully retain the seat for the Alberta NDP in the face of a concerted effort by the Alberta Liberal Party to take it back.

In October 2006, she was nominated by acclamation as the Alberta NDP candidate in the provincial constituency of Edmonton-Strathcona, succeeding former Alberta NDP leader Raj Pannu. The event was attended by then Federal NDP leader Jack Layton. Notley had previously considered running in the 2004 provincial election, but had refrained from doing so because her two children were still toddlers at the time. She was subsequently elected as an MLA in the 2008 Alberta provincial election. She was re-elected in the 2012 Alberta provincial election with the highest share of the vote of any MLA in Alberta at that time.

One month after her election in 2008 two Greenpeace protesters sneaked into the Shaw Conference Centre in Edmonton during a fundraising dinner for then Progressive Conservative premier Ed Stelmach to unfurl a banner that read "Stelmach: The Best Premier Oil Money Can Buy" in protest of his government's environmental policies. One of the protesters, a woman by the name of Denise Ogonoski, worked two days a week in Notley's constituency office. Notley described the issue as being a "personnel matter", saying that it was something she was "going to discuss with her in person and not through the media."

During her early days in office, Alberta NDP leader Brian Mason found her to be quick on her feet with an outgoing and warm personality. He also described her as being very nervous immediately after she was first elected as an MLA, not wanting to be left alone as the party's sole member in the legislature even when Mason was only leaving to go to the washroom. Despite these initial problems, Mason said she would go on to become "an articulate and passionate politician, a parliamentarian and a very, very effective communicator."

On October 18, 2014, Notley won the leadership of Alberta's New Democratic Party with 70% support, succeeding Brian Mason and becoming the 9th leader of the party. She defeated fellow MLA David Eggen and union leader Rod Loyola on the first ballot.

In addition to serving as party leader, Notley was critic for Health, International and Intergovernmental Relations, Status of Women, Justice, and Executive Council.

2015 election

Notley's first leadership test was in the May 5, 2015 provincial election. Following the reveal of a budget that slashed social spending, raised taxes and fees, and held the line on low corporate taxes, the incumbent Progressive Conservative premier, Jim Prentice, called the election. With the Official Opposition Wildrose Party reeling from a series of floor crossings and mass defections, most pundits and commentators felt that the PCs had a good shot at winning their thirteenth consecutive majority in the Legislature. With strong polling in Edmonton, some felt the Alberta NDP would form the official opposition.

By the middle of the campaign, however, pollsters began predicting a three-way race between the Progressive Conservatives, the Alberta NDP, and the Wildrose Party. Notley had managed to capitalize on the unpopularity of the PCs' budget, stating that she would instead raise corporate taxes and rollback fees and cuts. The sole televised leaders' debate proved to be a turning point, with Notley largely viewed as having the best performance. Jim Prentice also came under fire for saying "I know math is difficult" to Notley, in reference to the embarrassing miscalculation in the proposed NDP budget released two days prior, a remark which was widely seen as sexist and patronizing. Despite her strong performance, Notley herself admitted to having been extremely nervous leading up the event.

By the final week, the NDP emerged as the front runner. Notley herself said that she first realized she would be Alberta's next premier when she took a break in her hotel room a week before the election to read a credible poll that put the NDP solidly in first place. While she initially planned a whirlwind schedule to close out the campaign, she realized that this would have not only left her looking extremely haggard during her victory speech, but also would have left her without time to make plans for a transition.

On election night, the NDP won 54 seats, re-electing their four incumbents as well as 50 new members to the Legislative Assembly. The NDP had been expected to make a strong showing in Edmonton, which has traditionally been much friendlier to centre-left candidates than the rest of Alberta. However, they took every riding in the capital, all by very large margins—a result that exceeded even the most optimistic NDP projections. Even more surprisingly, the NDP took 15 seats in Calgary, long reckoned as the power base for both the provincial and federal Tories. This was mainly due to massive vote splitting between the Tories and Wildrose—a phenomenon which allowed the NDP to sweep Red Deer. The NDP also swept the city of Lethbridge in its own right and won 16 seats in the rest of Alberta, mostly in the northern and central parts of the province.

Premiership
Notley held her first caucus meeting as Premier-designate on May 9, 2015. Three days later, Notley announced that she would be retaining the previous head of the Alberta public service, Richard Dicerni, as well as appointing NDP party strategists Brian Topp and Adrienne King as her chief of staff and deputy chief of staff, respectively. She also met with outgoing Premier Jim Prentice that same day, in addition to extending the deadline for the province's school boards to submit their budgets, her first major deviation from the previous Progressive Conservative government's financial commitments as Premier-designate.

On May 22, 2015, Notley suspended Calgary-Bow MLA Deborah Drever from the Alberta NDP caucus after a series of controversial postings by Drever were discovered on social media websites such as Instagram and Facebook. Notley had previously announced that she had directed Drever, as a result of the media attention, to create a plan to improve education on violence against women, particularly outreach to groups working with vulnerable young women. This was before a later image surfaced which was considered to be homophobic, something which Notley apologized for on behalf of the party.

Swearing-in

Notley was sworn in as the 17th premier of Alberta along with her cabinet on May 24, 2015. When she took office she ended an 80-year streak of centre-right governments in Alberta (Social Credit from 1935 to 1971 and the Tories from 1971 to 2015). Her twelve-member cabinet was the smallest in the country, containing only 14% of the legislature's members. The slimmed down cabinet was met with a mixed response from pundits; some said it showed the NDP's lack of experienced people while others felt that it brought a much needed sense of economy and individual importance to the various positions.

The swearing-in ceremony was an unusually public event, held on the steps of the Alberta Legislature Building in front of a large crowd of spectators while a folk band played the national anthem and free popsicles and food were distributed from food trucks. The Alberta NDP was criticized, though, for using the event as a part of its party fundraising, for which they later apologized. The ceremony cost $19,298; more expensive than the swearing-in ceremonies of the previous two premiers, but still less than the expenditure for the swearing-in of Alison Redford in 2011.

Speech from the Throne
The government's first throne speech was read by newly appointed Lieutenant Governor Lois Mitchell on June 15, 2015. The speech announced three bills intended to ban corporate and union donations to political parties and to increase taxes on large corporations and high income earners, ending the flat tax rate that had been in place since the premiership of Ralph Klein. Both of these proposals were promised as part of the Alberta NDP's election platform. That same day Notley also announced the creation of a seventeen-member all-party committee tasked to look into ways to improve government accountability in areas such as whistleblower protection, electioneering, and conflicts of interest. The government also reached out to the Opposition benches by having the committee be initiated through a joint motion with Wildrose Party leader Brian Jean, with Liberal leader David Swann also being tasked with helping conduct a review of provincial mental health policy along with NDP MLA Danielle Larivee.

Aboriginal relations
On June 22, 2015, Notley apologized to the Aboriginal community of Alberta for a long history of neglect by prior governments. In particular she apologized for the province not addressing the issue with decades of abuse at government- and church-operated residential schools. Notley pledged that her government would engage and improve living conditions of Alberta's Aboriginal community.

Notley joined the chorus of Canadian premiers demanding a federal inquiry into the issue of missing and murdered Aboriginal women. The inquiry is intended to prevent abductions with early intervention and investigations of root issues affecting high-risk Aboriginal females. On December 8, 2015, Notley tweeted out her support of Prime Minister Justin Trudeau's announcement that a national inquiry into missing and murdered indigenous women and girls would be immediately launched. On December 15, 2015, Notley expressed her support for the recommendations outlined in the Truth and Reconciliation Committee's final report.

The budget of 2017 included $100 million to upgrade the provincial and federal waterworks facilities that provide drinkable water for Albertan First Nations Communities. Thirteen communities have endured chronic boil water advisory conditions for two decades.

In 2018, the Albertan government sold 150 hectares of land to the Fort McKay Métis for $1.6 million. The dealing was a precedent-setting event for the Métis community.

Climate change and environment
On November 22, 2015, Notley unveiled Alberta's updated climate change strategy, in time for the COP 21 conference in Paris. In doing so, Notley acted upon one of the NDP's central campaign promises: for years, the NDP had criticized the PC government's inaction on the climate change file. The plan was described in multiple media outlets as bold and far-reaching. This policy shift came about partly because of the characterization of Alberta oil as 'some of the dirtiest in the world' by US President Barack Obama, which the premier likened to a "kick in the teeth".

The plan included an economy-wide carbon tax starting in 2017 and a cap on emissions from the oil sands. The plan also included a phase-out of coal-fired electricity by 2030, a 10-year goal to halve methane emissions, as well as incentives for renewable energy. The plan won plaudits from both environmental groups and oil executives, who were present behind Notley at the announcement in Edmonton. The Canadian Association of Petroleum Producers also applauded the plan, saying it "provides direction that will allow the oil and natural gas industry to grow, further enhance its environmental performance through technological innovation, and is expected to improve market access to allow Canadian oil to reach more markets." The carbon tax was expected to raise $3 billion annually by 2018. Although Notley initially indicated that the carbon tax would be revenue neutral, similar to the structure imposed in neighbouring British Columbia, the plan did not cut any personal taxes, bringing into doubt Notley's assertion of revenue neutrality. Notley acted on the recommendations of a five-member panel appointed by Shannon Phillips, the minister of environment.

In November 2016, $1.4 billion was paid to compensate three major Albertan power producers (ATCO, Capital Power, and Transalta) to expedite the transition caused by the closure of six coal-fired power plants. The compensation was derived from the carbon tax and was to be paid over a period of 14 years.

In 2017, the Notley government resumed addressing the proliferation of abandoned wells by budgeting $235 million for the Orphan Well Association to begin land reclamation and rehabilitation of thousands of abandoned wells in the province. The plan was expected to carry through three years and create jobs.

A partnership between the provincial government, the Tallcree First Nation, and conservation group 'Nature Conservatory of Canada' created the  Birch River Wildland Provincial Park adjacent to the south of Wood Buffalo National Park. The park is the largest territory of protected boreal forest in the world. Syncrude contributed $2.3 million to the project.

Public health and welfare reforms
The NDP made revisions reforms and implemented new services to public health and well-being services. In 2018, the NDP proposed legislature Bill 9 ('The protecting choice for women accessing healthcare act') to enforce 50 m buffer zones around abortion clinics in Alberta to ban harassment by pro-life activists against users and personnel of these facilities.

Coverage for the abortion drug 'Mifegymiso' was made public in 2018.

Notley's government enacted campaign promised pilot project to fund $25/day per child into 18 Early Learning Child Care services (ELCC) for daycare services. It is expected that 1,000 spaces and 230 professional jobs for ELCC trained staff will be available by 2017. The project also seeks to research ways to provide for children with specialized needs. If the economy improves Notley intends to expand the program with additional $10 million in funding.

After a successful pilot project, in 2018 the NDP continued to expand the Daycare services by increasing capacity for 6,000 additional children and 100 additional ELCC centers. The expansion was made possible by a funding grant from the Federal government investing $136 million over 3 years as well from the Albertan government investing $14.5 million.

Albertans with a higher risk of HIV will be provided coverage for the Anti-HIV drug PrEP.

The proposed Bill 24 designed to protect LGBTQ rights will uphold anonymity among members of gay–straight alliance (GSA) clubs in public schools. Additionally gay conversion therapies will be banned in Alberta.

In 2019, Bill 26 was enacted which aims to combat poverty for Albertans suffering from poverty. Among the provisions are an increase of benefits for the elderly and AISH recipients connected to the consumer price index.

Economy and labour

Alberta's minimum wage was raised incrementally from $10.20 an hour in 2015 to $15.00 an hour in 2018.

Notley's government revised labour regulations with the implementation of the 'Fair and Family-friendly Act' (Bill 17), which came into effect in 2018. The revisions were the first overhaul of Alberta's labour laws in three decades.

In 2017, Saskatchewan Premier Brad Wall's government instigated a moratorium on vehicles with Albertan licence plates at government project sites in Saskatchewan. The Saskatchewan government initially said the ban was in response to reports that vehicles with Saskatchewan plates were being barred from Alberta sites, but did not provide evidence for these claims. Wall later claimed the ban was due to what he described as a "disturbing pattern of protectionist behaviour", citing, among other things, Alberta's $1.25-per-litre mark-up on beer prices in 2016. Notley's government responded by enacting the arbitration clause of the New West Partnership inter-provincial trade agreement. In January 2018, Saskatchewan rescinded the 'plate wars' moratorium in what it called a measure of good faith in advance of a decision on Alberta's beer prices by the Agreement on Internal Trade appeal panel.

In early 2018, an inter-provincial trade dispute between the BC NDP and Alberta NDP hampered the export of resources. Alberta's AGLC ceased to export wine produced in BC. Notley's government chose this as retaliation for Hogan's government decision to limit export of Bitumen from Alberta as protest to ongoing discussion of the proposed Trans Mountain Pipeline expansion. In 2017, Alberta imported $72 million of BC wine. However hospitality service businesses in Alberta worry their industry could be harmed with a prolonged embargo.

The government's Bill 31 of 2017 'A Better Deal for Consumers and Businesses Act' enacted a number of reforms to enhance consumer protections. Such as the abolition of purchasing bots to purchase blocks of online tickets for popular demanded events to prevent their inflated resale by the operators of such applications. The abolition of purchasing bots was enacted in August 2018. Consumers are empowered to sue the operators of bots if they have been financially injured should sellers and promoters of shows inadvertently fail to detect clandestine online bots.

The act also requires auto repair mechanics to provide a warranty for repair services, an estimate for the work. Consumers will also be empowered to litigate violators of consumer rights. High interest lenders and money transaction services will be regulated.

In 2019, the Albertan government agreed to lease 4,400 oil cars from Canadian Pacific Railway and Canadian National Railway. The service will resume in the summer of 2019 with an initial capacity of 20,000 barrels per day. The potential revenue expected is $6 billion over three years.

Education
In 2015, Notley's government froze tuition fees for post-secondary students. The freeze was initially meant to last two years, but it was extended until 2018. The NDP government also reversed a 1.4 per cent cut to post-secondary institutions and instead increased base funding by two per cent.

In 2016, to fulfill her campaign promise, Notley's government implemented a pilot program aimed at providing Alberta's neediest children with nutritious sustenance lunch programs. The program is expected to expand in coming years.

Key events in premiership
In 2016, a wild fire devastated Fort McMurray. In October 2016 Notley visited the construction site of the first rebuilt house. She rededicated an overpass crossing Highway 63, where first responders had welcomed residents home, as 'Responders Way Bridge'.

Notley welcomed former PC MLA Sandra Jansen into her party in November 2016. Jansen withdrew her membership and party leadership candidacy which she took to challenge the candidacy of Jason Kenney. She claimed that she was harassed over her position on human rights issues such as LGBTQ rights and abortion by Kenney's supporters. She warned of a hostile take over of democratic values by Kenney's campaign. Notley granted Jansen with a security detail as reports of vulgar death threats threatened Jansen.

Notley and Ma Xingrui, governor of Guangdong Province of China signed a provincial sistering agreement in 2017 during an economic trade mission to Asia.

Oil curtailments
On December 2, 2018, Notely announced the Alberta government would be instating oil production curtailments. The curtailments were meant to minimize lost revenue due to oil being sold at a lower market value as a bottleneck in transportation. The Alberta government rarely utilized this power, the last time was during the National Energy Program to limit federal revenues. Curtailments took effect in January 2019, under the Oil and Gas Conservation Act with the Alberta Energy Regulator monitoring the program.

Opiate Fentanyl epidemic
Since 2016, Notley's government was tasked with a fatal opiate epidemic as fentanyl emerged on the street narcotic market. Notley's government responded with harm reduction counter measures such as the distribution of naloxone injection kits and naloxone spray for the Edmonton and Calgary police and paramedic services.

Alberta Liberal Party leader David Swann petitioned the Notley government to issue a state of emergency. Neighbouring province British Columbia issued a state of emergency as did the Blood Tribe and Nakota nations as frequent and close succession fatal overdoses on these First Nations communities as well throughout Alberta. However, as of November 2016 the Notley government views the measure inappropriate as Albertan medical facilities were already established and gained experience through epidemics such as SARS. However the health ministry is showing great interest in the prospect of establishing safe sites in Edmonton and is reviewing the data for the harm reduction approach. Associate health minister NDP MLA Brandy Payne granted $230K to the 'Access to Medically Supervised Injection Services Edmonton' to apply for permission to establish a 'safe site' in Edmonton. Increased funding was allocated to treatment and for the communities to explore the prospect of operating 'safe sites'. However, fentanyl is usually ground and inhaled or ingested and not injected.

To further compound and aggravate the situation more potent opiates such as W-18 and carfentanil are emerging on the menu of illicit narcotics in Alberta. These compounds may be resistant to harm reduction counter measures such as the antidote naloxone.

Threats against Notley
After becoming Premier, Notley started to encounter abuse from Albertans who did not align with her values. As stated by the Edmonton Sun, "The statistics show that from 2003 to 2015, Alberta Sheriffs recorded 55 security incidents involving six premiers. 19 of those came in the last half of 2015, which happened to be Notley's first months in office. At least three of those incidents required police intervention." Most of the threats against Notley proliferated online with photos and posts, encouraging violence against the premier. According to statistics in 2016 from Alberta Justice, Notley is the Alberta premier with the most death threats. She was the subject of 412 harassment communiques, of which 26 were investigated by law enforcement. A professor argued that there have been growing trends of violence against female politicians. Most of these threats had been attributed to the NDP government's controversial farm safety legislation, Bill 6, which made Worker Compensation Board coverage mandatory on Alberta farms with paid, non-family employees, leading to thousands of protesters. Official Opposition leader and Wildrose Party Leader Brian Jean, despite criticizing Bill 6, made a call for the abuse directed at Notley to cease or else he would alert authorities. In late August 2016, Jean joked "I've been beating this drum for 10, 11 years. I will continue to beat it, I promise. But it's against the law to beat Rachel Notley", for which he apologized immediately for what he called “an inappropriate attempt at humour.”

Defeat
Following Notley's win in the 2015 provincial election, the Opposition Wildrose Party and third-place Progressive Conservative Association of Alberta, both right-of-centre, began contemplating forming a united right-wing party. Following referendums in both parties, they merged in 2017 into the United Conservative Party (UCP), with former federal minister and former PC leader Jason Kenney elected as leader later that year.

In the 2019 provincial election, the UCP won a majority of seats and about 55% of the popular vote. While the NDP retained all but one of their seats in Edmonton, significant losses in Calgary and rural Alberta reduced them to Official Opposition status. Notley pledged on election night to continue serving as Leader of the Opposition. The NDP government's defeat was the first time a governing party in Alberta had been defeated after a single term in office. The NDP opposition caucus with 24 seats will be the largest in Alberta since Laurence Decore's Liberals won 32 seats in 1993. Notley will be the first New Democrat to serve as Leader of the Official Opposition since Ray Martin (1984–1993). Her father, Grant Notley, held the same office from 1982 until his death in 1984.

In December 2019, Notley announced that she intended to lead the Alberta NDP into the next general election, due no later than May 2023.

Election results

2019 general election

2015 general election

2012 general election

2008 general election

References

External links

 Legislative Assembly of Alberta Members Listing
 Rachel Notley
 

1964 births
Premiers of Alberta
Alberta CCF/NDP leaders
Alberta New Democratic Party MLAs
Living people
Politicians from Edmonton
Women MLAs in Alberta
Canadian people of American descent
Canadian women lawyers
University of Alberta alumni
Osgoode Hall Law School alumni
Lawyers in Alberta
Female Canadian political party leaders
Canadian female first ministers
21st-century Canadian politicians
21st-century Canadian women politicians
Members of the Executive Council of Alberta